Harry Frederick Frazer (21 April 1916 – 8 April 2003) was a New Zealand rugby union player. A lock and prop, Frazer represented , and briefly  and  during World War II, at a provincial level, and was a member of the New Zealand national side, the All Blacks, from 1946 to 1949. He played 15 matches for the All Blacks including five internationals.

References

1916 births
2003 deaths
Rugby union players from Whanganui
People educated at Napier Boys' High School
New Zealand rugby union players
New Zealand international rugby union players
Hawke's Bay rugby union players
Auckland rugby union players
Waikato rugby union players
Rugby union locks
Rugby union props
Royal New Zealand Air Force personnel
New Zealand military personnel of World War II